Diskit is a village and headquarter of the Nubra tehsil and the Nubra subdivision in the Leh district of Ladakh, India. The Diskit Monastery is located in this village.

Demographics
According to the 2011 census of India, Diskit had 344 households. The effective literacy rate (i.e. the literacy rate of population excluding children aged 6 and below) is 76.57%.

Tourism
Diskit is one of the major towns in the Nubra region of Ladakh. It is a popular destination for tourists and is situated around 118 km from Leh and 7 km from the town of Hunder. Situated on the banks of the Shyok River, Diskit has many homestay and guest house options that are open throughout the year. The main market is a small place with a few tiny restaurants.

See Also
 KENDRIYA VIDYALAYA NUBRA
 Sub Division Hospital, Diskit, Nubra
 J&K Bank, Nubra
 Lamdon Model Senior Secondary School 
 Govt. Degree College Nubra
 PWD Office Nubra

References

Villages in Nubra tehsil